Isi Life Mein...! is a 2010 Bollywood film directed by Vidhi Kasliwal and starring Akshay Oberoi alongside Sandeepa Dhar in both their debut film. It was released on 24 December 2010. The film earned Filmfare Award for Best Female Debut nomination for Sandeepa Dhar.

Plot
The story begins in Ajmer, in the state of Rajasthan, where Rajnandini Khandelwal (Sandeepa Dhar) passes her 12th class examination and is the state-topper, winning three scholarships. Everyone is happy, but in keeping with her father's conservative tastes, he and her mother want Rajnandini to get married. However, Rajnandini wants to study further, desires that her mother supports, and so her mother tricks the father to send her to Mumbai to a relative's house, ostensibly to learn the culinary arts, as preparation for her marriage; however, secretly, the mother enrolled her in a college, and instead of staying with her aunt, as had been agreed with the father, arrangements have been made by the mother and her sister (aunt) to put her up in a hostel.

At the college, the principal instructs Rajnandini her that she must join one of the various extra-curricular societies, and so she volunteers for the College's Dramatics Society (DS), headed by Vivaan (Akshay Oberoi). When she introduces herself as Rajnandini Khandelwal, the others mock her name as being "long" and Vivaan abbreviates her name to "RJ."

The DS under Vivaan decides to participate in a National Theatre Festival, and Vivaan chooses William Shakespeare's The Taming of the Shrew; however when a member of the DS objects that the play is "MCP|ish," Vivaan declares that he will modify it to remove the misogyny, and that the play would be known as The Taming of the Shrew - Reborn.

Vivaan & RJ become good friends and love seems to be in the air. RJ helps Vivaan to overcome his hostility towards his demanding father and come to a compromise about his (Vivaan's) future career possibilities.

But on her birthday, Rajnandani and her friends-including Vivaan go to her aunt's house, where ,surprisingly, her dad opens the door. He is enraged with RJ for being out partying with her friends and her modernized dress and demeanor. He takes her back to Ajmer where her marriage was being fixed with the son of an old business associate, Nareshchandra.

A heart-broken Vivaan decides to go to Ajmer with the entire DS gang reaching RJ's home during the preparations for her engagement ceremony.

On being confronted for the real reason of his presence by RJ's hostile father, Vivaan confesses that his play cannot work without RJ and that he wants her to resume her leading part, even if only for the final play. RJ's father angrily rejects the request and denounces Vivaan and his friends as having no regards or respect for traditions.

However, as the day goes by, RJ's father is under increasing stress due to Nareshchandra's escalating financial demands, and comes to appreciate Vivaan and his friends for their help in meeting these expectations, coming to the realization that "one's own exploit and abuse while strangers aid and succor," so much so, that, as RJ and the groom are to exchange vows, her father forbids her, breaks off the marriage with Nareshchandra's son and decides to allow RJ pursue her passion and fulfil her dreams.

The play wins the 1st prize and everyone in RJ's and Vivaan's families are extremely happy; Vivaan and RJ get engaged, and RJ is sent to New York to develop her natural passion for choreography after which it is planned that they will get married. The story ends with the last scene when everyone comes to the airport to drop RJ.

Cast
Akshay Oberoi as Vivaan 
Sandeepa Dhar as Rajnandini Khandelwal (RJ)
Mohnish Behl as Ravimohan Khandelwal, RJ’s father 
Prachi Shah as Pratibha Khandelwal, RJ’s mother 
Shagufta Ali as Maa'sa (Mrs. Khandelwal)
Aditya Raj Kapoor as Prashant, Vivaan’s father 
Mansee Deshmukh as Riya
 Ayush Mehra as Sunil
Vibha Anand as Nupur
Moin Khan as TinTIn
Samaira Rao as Valerie
Akash Bathija as Sumo
Daisy Irani as herself
Dalip Tahil as himself
Neha Kakkar as Sam
Gajendra Chauhan as Nareshchand (Groom's father)
Salman Khan (special appearance)

Soundtrack

The film's soundtrack is composed by Meet Bros Anjjan with lyrics penned by Manoj Muntashir.

References

External links 
 
 
 

Films based on The Taming of the Shrew
2010s Hindi-language films
2010 directorial debut films
Indian romance films
Rajshri Productions films
2010 romance films
2010 films
Hindi-language romance films